The Pampanga Provincial Board is the Sangguniang Panlalawigan (provincial legislature) of the Philippine province of Pampanga.

The members are elected via plurality-at-large voting: the province is divided into four districts, the first and fourth districts sending two members each, and the second and third districts sending three members each to the provincial board; the number of candidates the electorate votes for and the number of winning candidates depends on the number of members their district sends. The vice governor is the ex officio presiding officer, and only votes to break ties. The vice governor is elected via the plurality voting system province-wide.

The districts used in appropriation of members is coextensive with the legislative districts of Pampanga, with the exception that Angeles City, a highly urbanized city, is excluded in the first district.

Aside from the regular members, the board also includes the provincial federation presidents of the Liga ng mga Barangay (ABC, from its old name "Association of Barangay Captains"), the Sangguniang Kabataan (SK, youth councils) and the Philippine Councilors League (PCL).

Apportionment

List of members

Current members 
These are the members after the 2022 Philippine Local elections

 Vice Governor: Lilia Pineda (Kambilan)

References 

Provincial boards in the Philippines
Government of Pampanga